Itumeleng Gideon Khobane (born 6 March 1977) is the CEO of MultiChoice subsidiary SuperSport.

Early life and education
Khobane was born in Springs, Gauteng and was educated at Queen's College where he played athletics and rugby then matriculated in 1995. He has Masters in Marketing and Management at Wits Business School and a Bachelor of Commerce in Marketing and Management at University of South Africa.

Career
He was the CEO of SuperSport International from April 2016.
He was previously also the director of general entertainment channels for M-Net.

Personal life
In August 2014, he got engaged to Susan Younis, the Executive Producer of MTV Base Africa and founder of Ms You TV and they married on 30 October 2015. They have a son named Amani Ellie Khobane born in 2017.

References

External links

1977 births
21st-century South African businesspeople
Living people